Lusatian Serbian may refer to:
 Lusatian Serbian languages (Sorbian languages)
 Lusatian Serbs (Sorbs)
 Lusatian Serbia (Sorbia)